De Mars is a smock mill in De Blesse, Friesland, Netherlands which was built in 1997 on the base of an earlier mill. The mill is listed as a Rijksmonument, number 527616.

History

An unnamed smock mill was built here in 1834. It drove two pairs of  diameter millstones. The mill was probably built for Philips Schlecht. As built, it was a "grondzeiler", lacking the brick base it later stood on. The base was built in the late nineteenth century. An electric motor was used as auxiliary power from 1919. A sailstock broke c1925.  The mill machinery was dismantled c1927. The mill was demolished c1958, leaving the base standing.

In 1985, the mill was bought by Mars, who decided to restore the mill back to working order. The drainage mill De Zwarte Haan, which stood by De Bildtse Polder, was purchased and dismantled in April 1997. In November 1997, the mill was re-erected at De Blesse. In June 1999, a new cap was placed on the mill. This had previously been on a mill at Neustadtgödens-Wedelfeld, Germany. The brake wheel from the windmill Olle Widde, Ten Post, Groningen was incorporated into the rebuild. The mill was officially opened on 8 September 2000 and named De Mars.

Description

De Mars is what the Dutch describe as a "stellingmolen". It is a three-storey smock mill on a three-storey base. The smock and cap are thatched. The mill is winded by tailpole and winch. The mill drives a single pair of  diameter millstones.

Millers
Reference :-
 Philips Schlecht (1834–65)
 Roelof Schlecht (1865-1948)

Public access

De Mars is open to the public daily except Sundays.

References

Windmills in Friesland
Windmills completed in 1997
Smock mills in the Netherlands
Rijksmonuments in Friesland
Octagonal buildings in the Netherlands